Carsta Genäuß (later Kühn, born 30 November 1959) is an East German sprint canoer who competed from the late 1970s to the mid-1980s. She won a gold medal in the K-2 500 m event at the 1980 Summer Olympics in Moscow.

Genäuß-Kühn also won seven gold medals at the ICF Canoe Sprint World Championships with three in the K-2 500 m event (1981, 1983, 1985) and four in the K-4 500 m (1978, 1981, 1983, 1985).

References

1959 births
Living people
Canoeists at the 1980 Summer Olympics
East German female canoeists
Olympic canoeists of East Germany
Olympic gold medalists for East Germany
Sportspeople from Dresden
Olympic medalists in canoeing
ICF Canoe Sprint World Championships medalists in kayak
Medalists at the 1980 Summer Olympics